Gardenia dacryoides, commonly known as malava, is a species of plant in the family Rubiaceae native to northern Australia.

References

dacryoides
Eudicots of Western Australia
Plants described in 1997
Taxa named by Christopher Francis Puttock